Eötvös is an old spelling of the Hungarian word ötvös, meaning "gold- and silversmith".


Family name 

Eötvös can refer to one of several Hungarian people:
 Ignác Eötvös (born 1763, Kassa), Hungarian politician (1763-1838)
 József Eötvös (1813, Buda - 1871), a Hungarian statesman and author
 Loránd Eötvös (1848 - 1919), a Hungarian physicist
 Zoltán Eötvös (1891, Tokaj - 1936), a Hungarian speed skater
 Péter Eötvös (born 1944, Odorheiu Secuiesc), composer and conductor
 József Eötvös (musician) (born 1962, Pécs), a Hungarian guitar player

Ötvös 
 Fülöp Ö. Beck (1873, Pápa - 1945, Budapest), a Hungarian sculptor, medal maker

Otvos 
 Jim Otvos

Other 
Eötvös can also refers to several concepts and a place, all named for Loránd Eötvös:
 an eotvos (unit), a unit of gravitational gradient
 the Eötvös effect, a concept in geodesy
 the Eötvös experiment, an experiment determining the correlation between gravitational and inertial mass
 the Eötvös number, a concept in fluid dynamics
 the Eötvös (crater) on the moon
 the Eötvös rule for predicting surface tension dependent on temperature

See also
List of titled noble families in the Kingdom of Hungary

References

Hungarian words and phrases
Hungarian-language surnames